Jennifer Eliogu  (born April 30, 1976) is a Nigerian actress and singer mainly notable for being an actress.  In 2016, Eliogu received the Special Recognition Award at the City People Entertainment Awards for her contributions to the Nigerian movie industry. Eliogu, In 2014 for her role in empowering women, was presented the Award For Excellence at the African Women Leadership Conference which took place in the United States of America.

Early life and education
Eliogu is from Idemili in Anambra State, a southeastern  geographical area of Nigeria but was raised in Lagos state, which is in the southwest of Nigeria. Eliogu obtained a diploma from the University of Jos and obtained her B.Sc. degree from Lagos State University.

Career
Eliogu in 1997 officially debuted into the Nigerian movie industry with the movie titled House On Fire. Eliogu briefly exited the Nigerian movie industry and delved into music professionally in 2012 and released her first music project titled Ifunanya which was nominated for an award in that same year for Best R&B Video at the Nigeria Music Video Awards (NMVA).

Among other notable personalities Nollywood she has worked with includes, Rich Tanksley, Kenneth Okolie, Susan Peters, Bolanle Ninalowo, Moyo Lawal, Desmond Elliot, Rukky Sanda among others. She encourage your actresses that talent will take them far and not nudity.

Awards and nominations

Acting career
Eliogu was awarded the Special Recognition Award at the City People Entertainment Awards In 2016.

She also has an Award for excellence at the 2014 African Women Leadership Conference held in United States Of America for her role in empowering women.

Music career
Eliogu's music project titled Ifunanya was nominated for Best R&B Video at the Nigeria Music Video Awards (NMVA)

Personal life
Eliogu is married and has two children.

Selected filmography
A Little White Lie (2017)
A Time To Heal  (2017)
Plane Crash  (2008)
Sisters Love  (2008)
Risky Affair (2004)
Faces Of Beauty (2004)
Love And Pride (2004)
Moment Of Confession (2004)
My Blood (2004)
Schemers : Bad Babes (2004)

See also
 List of Nigerian actors

References

External links

Living people
21st-century Nigerian actresses
1976 births
Nigerian film actresses
Actresses from Anambra State
University of Jos alumni
Lagos State University alumni
Nigerian women singers
Igbo actresses